Mette Jacobsen (born 24 March 1973 in Nakskov) is a former freestyle and butterfly swimmer from Denmark who competed in five consecutive Summer Olympics for her native country, beginning in 1988. She won a total of 32 individual medals in international championships in a period from 1989 to 2005.

Doping allegation and suspension
Prior to the 2004 Summer Olympics, Jacobsen was accused by FINA of using Salbutamol as a doping substance. In a 2006 interview with DR she told Jyllands-Posten that it had been legal for her to use this substance since 1993, because of her asthma. The substance itself produced prednisone, which according to FINA then increased her swimming capacity. She was suspended for half a year as a warning, which was issued by LEN, but never resumed swimming, because she could not compete without it.

References

External links
Profile on FINA-website

1973 births
Living people
People from Nakskov
Danish female swimmers
Olympic swimmers of Denmark
Swimmers at the 1988 Summer Olympics
Swimmers at the 1992 Summer Olympics
Swimmers at the 1996 Summer Olympics
Swimmers at the 2000 Summer Olympics
Swimmers at the 2004 Summer Olympics
Danish female butterfly swimmers
Danish female freestyle swimmers
World Aquatics Championships medalists in swimming
Medalists at the FINA World Swimming Championships (25 m)
European Aquatics Championships medalists in swimming